Raleigh Township (also designated Township 1) is one of twenty townships within Wake County, North Carolina, United States. As of the 2010 census, Raleigh Township had a population of 117,838, a 6.5% increase over 2000.

Raleigh Township, occupying  in central Wake County, is almost completely occupied by portions of the city of Raleigh, including the city's downtown area. The township is, for the most part, bounded by the I-440 Raleigh Beltline.

References

Townships in Wake County, North Carolina
Townships in North Carolina